Sasha Madyarchyk is an English wrestler who won a bronze medal at the 2010 Commonwealth Games in the Men's 60 kg wrestling event.

See also
England at the 2010 Commonwealth Games

References

British male sport wrestlers
Living people
Commonwealth Games bronze medallists for England
Commonwealth Games medallists in wrestling
Wrestlers at the 2010 Commonwealth Games
English male wrestlers
Year of birth missing (living people)
Medallists at the 2010 Commonwealth Games